Vučja Luka is a village in the municipalities of Istočni Stari Grad (Republika Srpska) and Stari Grad Sarajevo, Bosnia and Herzegovina.

Demographics 
According to the 2013 census, its population was 257, with 256 of them living in the Republika Srpska part and 1 Serb living in the Federation part.

References

Populated places in Istočni Stari Grad
Villages in Republika Srpska
Populated places in Stari Grad, Sarajevo